The 2003 Carroll Fighting Saints football team was an American football team that represented Carroll College as a member of the Frontier Conference during the 2003 NAIA football season. In their fifth season under head coach Mike Van Diest, the Saints compiled a perfect 15–0 record (8–0 against conference opponents) and won the NAIA national championship, defeating , 41–28, in the NAIA National Championship Game.

Carroll's sophomore quarterback Tyler Emmert received the 2003 NAIA Football Player of the Year Award. In 2003, Carroll's offense under Emmert averaged more than 40 points and approximately 500 yards per game.

The team played its home games at Nelson Stadium in Helena, Montana.

Schedule

References

Carroll
Carroll Fighting Saints football seasons
NAIA Football National Champions
College football undefeated seasons
Carroll Fighting Saints football